George Piper Dances is a London-based contemporary dance company.

George Piper Dances was founded in 2001 by Michael Nunn and William Trevitt, both dancers with The Royal Ballet.

References

2001 establishments in England
Dance companies in the United Kingdom
Ballet in London
Performing groups established in 2001